Emil Heß (3 February 1889, in Wald, Zurich – 2 March 1945, in Zurich) was a Swiss actor on stage and screen.

Personal life

Heß married Elizabeth Ellinghaus by whom he had three sons Wolfgang, Urs and Migg.

Urs Hess (1940) and Migg Hess (1943) followed in the footsteps of their father and played in Zurich venues such as the Playhouse and the Bernhardt Theatre.  They also had roles in a few films during the 1950s.

Career

Selected stage performances 
Woyzeck (1922, 1927)

Filmography 

Herbstzauber (1918) as Graf Victor von Ulmrode
Seltsame Seelen (1918)
L'ouragan sur la montagne (1922)
Fredericus Rex (1922, part 3) as Minister August Friedrich Von Boden
Jud Süß (1940) as Schmied Hans Bogner
Das Herz der Königin (1940) as Lord Douglas
 (1940) as Exzellenz Baroux
The Swedish Nightingale (1941) as Thorwaldsen
Der Strom (1941)
Der Weg ins Freie (1941) as Müetli
 (1941) as König
Tanz mit dem Kaiser (1941)
Wenn du noch eine Heimat hast (1942) as Ullrichs
Wedding in Barenhof (1942) as Königliche Hoheit
Between Heaven and Earth (1942) as Valentin, Buchhalter
Andreas Schlüter (1942) as Counsellor Dankelman
Die Entlassung (1942) as Grand Duke Vladimir
Love Me (1942)
Floh im Ohr (1943) as Großvater Christian Lohhof
Back Then (1943) as Alvarez, Veras Verteidiger
Dreaming (1944) as Dr. Körber
Herr Sanders lebt gefährlich (1944) as Gil Schnyder
Aufruhr der Herzen (1944) as Martin Atzinger
Der Engel mit dem Saitenspiel (1944) as Linus Lanzinger, bayr. Postillon
Der Erbförster (1945)
Kamerad Hedwig (1945) as Vater Schulz (unfinished film)
Jan und die Schwindlerin (1947) as Hinnerk Remmers
Jugendliebe (1947)
Die Kreuzelschreiber (1950) as Großbauer
Erzieherin gesucht (1950) as Revendonk (final film role)

References

External links

1889 births
1945 deaths
Swiss male stage actors
Swiss male film actors
Swiss male silent film actors
People from Hinwil District